Events from the year 1771 in Russia

Incumbents
 Monarch – Catherine II

Events
  Moscow plague riot of 1771
 Pyatnitskoye cemetery

Births
  - Count Mikhail Miloradovich, Russian general of Serbian origin, prominent during the Napoleonic Wars. (d. 1825)

Deaths
 29 April - Francesco Bartolomeo Rastrelli, Italian architect who worked mainly in Russia. (b. 1700)

References

1771 in Russia
Years of the 18th century in the Russian Empire